is a Japanese Brazilian singer-songwriter who was the lead vocalist of the popular Japanese city pop band 1986 Omega Tribe and its successor band Carlos Toshiki & Omega Tribe during the mid to late 80's. He was a popular vocalist during the band's era, with the singles "Kimi wa 1000%" and "Aquamarine no Mama de Ite" being hit singles on the Oricon charts.

Born in southern Brazil, Toshiki imitated songs that his father used to play as a DJ, ranging from pop songs to traditional enka. His father noticed his talent, and to encourage him to sing in front of a crowd, he promised Toshiki that if he won a singing competition he would send him to Tokyo. After winning a competition, he became popular among the crowd, and his father saved up money for his visit to Tokyo. During his time in the city, he was discriminated against for being Brazilian, being paid less as a dishwasher and living off of free samples. During his time as a dishwasher, his boss asked him to sing karaoke, where he gained fame for his "sweet and transparent" voice. After failed attempts to have a career as a singer, a demo tape was given to producer Koichi Fujita, where he requested Toshiki as the new vocalist of Omega Tribe.

After the dissolution of the band in 1991, Toshiki had a small successful career before leaving the music industry to become a restaurant operator in Brazil. He then attended a university to study biotechnology, improving garlic cultivation and becoming a garlic specialist. In 2018, he joined the band B-EDGE as a lead vocalist, which also includes three members who have worked with Toshiki during the Carlos Toshiki & Omega Tribe era.

Biography

Early life and career 
Toshiki was born in Londrina, and grew up in Maringá, Paraná, in southern Brazil to a Japanese father and a Nikkei mother, who ran a restaurant. As a child, he spent a lot of time listening to a range of songs from American pop to Japanese songs, most of them were provided by his father, a DJ at a radio station. His father noticed his talent for singing, but Toshiki didn't like to sing in front of people, instead locking himself in his room. In order to try to make him sing, his father promised him that if he won a competition, he would send him to Tokyo. At the age of 9, he won the Paran State Kayo Grand Prix/Children's Rhythm Division, participated in all Brazil sponsored by the Brazilian Kayo Association, won the Boys' Division at the age of 16, and sang Hideki Saijo's "Blue Sky Blue" in the Youth Division at the age of 17. The songs Toshiki sang were known as the "Songs of Toshiki" in the Brazilian Nikkei society. With the competition won, Toshiki was sent to Japan in 1982.

Toshiki debuted with the single "Lucia", which was unsuccessful. During this time, Toshiki began a job as a dishwasher at a restaurant, where he was paid less than average because he was Brazilian and was forced to live of free samples. One day, his boss asked Toshiki to sing karaoke during breaks, which he did for easy money. After he began singing, many of the customers began coming just to hear Toshiki's voice, and he became popular with the customers. In 1985, after failed attempts to have a solo career as a singer, he sent a demo tape to various companies in hopes of scoring another single. The demo tape landed in the hands of Koichi Fujita, a producer and owner of Triangle Productions. He had previously produced for Kiyotaka Sugiyama & Omega Tribe, which had disbanded that year, and Fujita decided that Toshiki would be a good candidate as the lead vocalist for a new Omega Tribe band.

Omega Tribe 
With Toshiki as the group's new vocalist, Fujita hired guitarist Mitsuya Kurokawa and re-hired the group's previous guitarist and keyboardist, Shinji Takashima and Toshitsugu Nishihara. Fujita then invited Toshiki to Hawaii to talk about his life where he was asked if there were any similarities between Japanese and Portuguese words, where Toshiki responded with the words "sen" (one thousand in Japanese) and "cem" (one hundred in Portuguese). With the revelation, the group released their first single, "Kimi wa 1000%" in 1986 under the name 1986 Omega Tribe. The song was an instant hit, peaking at No. 4 on the Oricon charts. They then released the album Navigator that same year, reaching No. 2 on the Oricon charts. They then released "Super Chance" and "Cosmic Love", reaching No. 2 and No. 3 on the charts respectively. In 1987, the band released that album Crystal Night, which was the number-one album on the Oricon LP Chart. The band subsequently released the singles "Miss Lonely Eyes" and "Stay Girl Stay Pure" after the album.

In 1988, Kurokawa left the group due to health issues, leaving Toshiki, Takashima, and Nishihara as the remaining members. The group changed their name to Carlos Toshiki & Omega Tribe, in an attempt to help boost Toshiki's popularity as well as changing it from an older year. The group released the album Down Town Mystery that same year, with help from American artists such as Joey McCoy, Wornell Jones, and Marty Bracey. On August 10, 1988, the group released "Aquamarine no Mama de Ite," which peaked at No. 3 on the Oricon charts and is considered their signature song alongside "Kimi wa 1000%". On November 10, 1988, backing singer Joey McCoy joined the group with the single "Reiko". After three more albums, the group announced to the TV program Music Station that they would disband following a tour. The band officially disbanded on March 16, 1991, a year after the announcement.

Solo career 
With the disbandment of Omega Tribe, Toshiki started his solo career with the single "Yoakemade Borderless," charting at No. 97 on the Oricon charts. He then followed up with the album Emotion – Migigawa no Heart-tachi e in the same year.  In 1993, he released the singles "I Love Japan," included in the album Alquimist, and "Passion," and in 1994, released "Yume o Mi Sasete." The latter two were included in the album Dōshitedarou?

The 1994 single "Forever" was his only other single to have a position on the Oricon chart, with it also being his highest position at No. 74. After releasing the 1995 album Shake It Down, Toshiki stopped all his musical activities after suffering from a herniated disc. He returned to Brazil to become a restaurant operator.

Absence and return to music
In 2000, he appeared on the Nippon TV program "Ano hito wa ima!?" where it was revealed that he was a restaurant operator in Brazil. He made an emergency visit to Japan to sing "Kimi wa 1000%" and "Aquamarine no Mama de Ite." In 2010, he appeared on the Fuji TV program "Dai Tsuiseki! Ano Nyūsu no Tsudzuki" where it was reported that Toshiki was in charge of the Brazilian breeding company Techno Planter, before "Kimi wa 1000%" was sung again.

From February to March 2017, he performed a live and nationwide tour for the 30th anniversary of his debut, starting at Yokohama and going to Tokyo, Nagoya, Osaka, and Fukuoka. For eight days in March, he was featured in the Fuji TV program "Nonstop!" and returned to Japan to help with his family's restaurant, and spent time away from his musical activities. When he turned 40, he decided to pursue an agricultural path, entering a national university in Brazil to study biotechnology and working for a seed company at 47. He succeeded in improving garlic cultivation, becoming an executive for a garlic seed company, and was featured in a local magazine as "one of the greatest garlic specialists in Brazil."

In 2018, Toshiki joined the band B-EDGE, becoming the lead vocalist of the group from 2017 to 2019. The group released the album Nova Nostalga in 2018, covering many of Toshiki's songs during the Omega Tribe era.

Personal life 
Toshiki married Minako Nakayama in 1995, but divorced her in 2018. He then remarried to Pepe Persida, who had a daughter of her own before her marriage. He has one son with Persida named Arthur Noah Takahashi, who was born on September 4, 2018.

Discography

Singles

Studio albums

Books 
Futari no Karurosu (Sony, 1 July 1988)

References

External links 
 Official Website
 IMDb Page

1964 births
People from Maringá
People from Paraná (state)
Brazilian people of Japanese descent
Brazilian musicians of Japanese descent
Japanese male singer-songwriters
Japanese singer-songwriters
Brazilian restaurateurs
Warner Music Japan artists
Nippon Columbia artists
EMI Music Japan artists
Living people
Omega Tribe (Japanese band) members